WBQK (107.9 MHz) is a commercial FM radio station licensed to West Point, Virginia, and serving the Virginia Peninsula and the Middle Peninsula. WBQK is owned and operated by Davis Media, LLC. It simulcasts the Adult Album Alternative (AAA) radio format originating on co-owned 92.3 WTYD Deltaville.

Along with WTYD, WBQK carries William & Mary Tribe football and basketball radio broadcasts, branded as the "William & Mary Bookstore Tribe Radio Network."

History
The station became WBQK in December 2005, and began carrying a classical music format in May 2006. Prior to this, the station held the call letters WTYD.

On June 1, 2019, WBQK changed from classical music to a simulcast of "All News 102" WXTG-FM.

On June 5, 2020, WBQK flipped from a simulcast of "All News 102" WXTG-FM to a simulcast of adult album alternative-formatted WTYD, branded as "The Tide".

References

Previous logo

External links

1991 establishments in Virginia
Radio stations established in 1991
BQK
William & Mary Tribe
Adult album alternative radio stations in the United States